Osvaldo Noé Golijov (born December 5, 1960) is an Argentine composer of classical music and music professor, known for his vocal and orchestral work.

Biography
Osvaldo Golijov was born in and grew up in La Plata, Argentina, in a Jewish family that immigrated to Argentina from Romania. His mother was a piano teacher, and his father was a physician. He studied piano in La Plata and studied composition with Gerardo Gandini.

In 1983, Golijov immigrated to Israel, where he studied with Mark Kopytman at the Rubin Academy of Music in Jerusalem. Three years later, he studied with George Crumb at the University of Pennsylvania, where he earned his Doctor of Philosophy degree. In 1991, Golijov joined the faculty of the College of the Holy Cross in Worcester, Massachusetts, where he was named Loyola Professor of Music in 2007. During the 2012–13 concert season, he occupied the Richard and Barbara Debs Composer's Chair at Carnegie Hall.

As of 2016, Golijov lives in Brookline, Massachusetts.

Both of Golijov's marriages have ended in divorce. He has three children with his first wife, Silvia. He was subsequently married to architect and designer Neri Oxman.

Music career
Golijov grew up listening to chamber music, Jewish liturgical and klezmer music, and the nuevo tango of Ástor Piazzolla. His Dreams and Prayers of Isaac the Blind was inspired by the writings and teachings of Rabbi Yitzhak Saggi Nehor.

In 1996, his work Oceana was premiered at the Oregon Bach Festival. He composed La Pasión según San Marcos for the Passion 2000 project in commemoration of the 250th anniversary of the death of Johann Sebastian Bach. In 2010, he composed Sidereus for a consortium of 35 American orchestras, to commemorate Galileo.

Golijov had a long working relationship with soprano Dawn Upshaw, who he called his muse. She premiered some of his works, often written specifically for her. These included Three Songs for Soprano and Orchestra and his popular opera, Ainadamar, which premiered at Tanglewood in 2003.

Starting in 2000, Golijov composed movie soundtracks for documentaries and other films, including The Man Who Cried, Youth Without Youth, Tetro and Twixt. He also composed and arranged chamber music, including for the Kronos Quartet (Nuevo) and the St. Lawrence String Quartet.

Golijov's song cycle "Falling Out of Time" was inspired by a novel by Israeli author David Grossman.

Controversies

Golijov came under scrutiny in 2011 for a series of commissions that were either delayed or cancelled. A violin concerto written for the Los Angeles Philharmonic was not completed in time, Golijov missed a second deadline the following year in Berlin, and a third composition missed its January 2013 premiere at Disney Hall.

This followed a similar cancellation in 2010, when a scheduled song cycle had to be removed from the program when it was not completed in time. The March 2011 premiere of a new string quartet for the St. Lawrence Quartet was also postponed, though the work, Qohelet, was completed later that year and premiered by the quartet in October 2011.

Around 2006, the Metropolitan Opera commissioned Golijov to compose an opera, to be performed in the 2018–19 season. In 2016, the Met cancelled the commission because of the composer's lack of progress.

Tom Manoff, a composer and critic, and Brian McWhorter, a trumpeter, alleged that Golijov's Sidereus was largely copied from Michael Ward-Bergeman's composition Barbeich. Alex Ross of The New Yorker reviewed both scores and wrote, "To put it bluntly, 'Sidereus' is 'Barbeich' with additional material attached." Ross added that Ward-Bergeman knew of and did not object to Golijov's borrowings, having written, "Osvaldo and I came to an agreement regarding the use of 'Barbeich' for 'Sidereus.' The terms were clearly understood, and we were both happy to agree. Osvaldo and I have been friends and collaborators for years. I don’t have anything else to say about the matter." A consortium of 35 orchestras had paid Golijov $75,000, supplemented by a $50,000 grant from the League of American Orchestras, to write a 20-minute work. The work that Golijov produced was only 9 minutes. Golijov had used that same musical material in his 2009 composition Radio.

Golijov responded to these questions by explaining that he composed the original musical material jointly with Ward-Bergeman for a film score which in the end did not include the material, and that he used it by agreement with Ward-Bergeman, who did not comment publicly on the matter. Golijov cited Monteverdi, Schubert and Mahler as other composers who used existing musical material to create new music.

Notable compositions 
Some of Golijov's notable works include the following:

 Yiddishbbuk (1992), for string quartet.
 The Dreams and Prayers of Isaac the Blind (1994), for klezmer clarinet and string quartet (and later for clarinet and string orchestra)
 Oceana (1996), cantata for soloist, boys choir, chorus, electric guitars, and reduced orchestra (strings, flutes, and percussion).
 La Pasión según San Marcos (St. Mark's Passion) (2000)
 Three Songs for Soprano and Orchestra (2001). Lúa Descolorida from this set was later repurposed as the 'Peter's Tears' Aria in La Pasión según San Marcos.
 Tenebrae (2002), for soprano, clarinet and string quartet.
 Ainadamar (2003): Golijov's first opera, libretto by David Henry Hwang.
 Ayre (2004): a song cycle for soprano and ensemble, premiered by Upshaw and The Andalucian Dogs.
 Azul (2006), for cello and orchestra, premiered by Yo-Yo Ma at Tanglewood.
 She Was Here (2008), an orchestration of four songs by Schubert, premiered by the Saint Paul Chamber Orchestra.
 Sidereus (2010), for orchestra, commissioned by a consortium of 36 orchestras.

Awards and recognition

Awards
 Guggenheim Fellowship (1995)
 MacArthur Fellowship (2003)
 Musical America Composer of the Year (2006)
 Grammy Awards x2 (2007): Ainadamar, Best Opera Recording and Best Classical Contemporary Composition
 Vilcek Prize in Music (2008)

Appointments
 Merkin Hall (New York), composer-in-residence (1998)
 Los Angeles Philharmonic Music Alive Series, composer-in-residence (2001)
 Ravinia Festival, composer-in-residence (2002)
 Spoleto Festival USA, composer-in-residence (2002, 2011)
 Ojai Music Festival, composer-in-residence (2006)
 Mostly Mozart Festival, composer-in-residence (2007)
 Chicago Symphony Orchestra, composer-in-residence (2007–2010)
 Holland Festival, composer-in-residence (2008)
 Carnegie Hall, Debs Composer Chair (2012–13)

Selected discography 
Film soundtracks
 Youth Without Youth soundtrack (Deutsche Grammophon/Universal Classics, 2007)
 Tetro soundtrack (Deutsche Grammophon/Universal Classics, 2009)
 The Man Who Cried soundtrack (Sony Classical/SME SK 61870)
Voice, chamber music and orchestral
 Yiddishbbuk (EMI Classics 7243 5 57356 2 1) – nominated for a 2003 Grammy for Best Chamber Music Performance
 Oceana (Deutsche Grammophon/Universal Classics, 2007)
 Ayre (Deutsche Grammophon/Universal Classics 477 5414)—nominated for a 2006 Grammy for Best Classical Contemporary Composition
 Ainadamar (Dawn Upshaw, Robert Spano, Atlanta Symphony Orchestra) (Deutsche Grammophon/Universal Classics)—won two 2007 Grammy Awards for recording and for composition
 La Pasión según San Marcos The Passion according to St. Mark (live & studio) (Deutsche Grammophon/Universal Classics 479 0346)
 The Dreams and Prayers of Isaac the Blind performed by the Kronos Quartet (Nonesuch/Elektra 79444)
 Voices of Light, Lúa Descolorida sung by soprano Dawn Upshaw (Nonesuch/Elektra 79812)
 Night Prayers, K'vakarat on recording of the Kronos Quartet (Nonesuch/Elektra 79346)
 Caravan arrangements for the Kronos Quartet (Nonesuch/Elektra 79490)

References

External links
 Official website of Osvaldo Golijov
 Osvaldo Golijov discusses Aidanamar on WGBH radio
 NPR's Tom Huizenga on La Pasión Según San Marcos
 The Passion of Osvaldo Golijov
 

Argentine classical composers
American classical composers
1960 births
Living people
Jewish classical composers
EMI Classics and Virgin Classics artists
Deutsche Grammophon artists
Male classical composers
Grammy Award winners
MacArthur Fellows
Argentine emigrants to the United States
Argentine Jews
Argentine people of Romanian-Jewish descent
People from La Plata
20th-century Argentine artists
21st-century American composers
20th-century classical composers
21st-century classical composers
20th-century American composers
20th-century American male musicians
21st-century American male musicians
Nonesuch Records artists